Carlos Germán Arangio (born 23 May 1976, in Buenos Aires) is a retired professional football player from Argentina who last played for Albinegros de Orizaba in Mexico's Primera Division A.

Playing for Racing Club de Avellaneda, Arangio made his First Division debut in 1994. He represented Argentina as part of the U-20 team that won the 1995 FIFA World Youth Championship. He then transferred to Mexico where he played for Toros Neza in the Primera División from 1996 to 2000.

On April 1, 1997 Arangio was involved in an infamous incident during an international friendly between Toros Neza and the Jamaica national team. After he responded to a bad tackle by punching his opponent, a five-minute brawl ensued and the match was called off.

For the 2000-2001 season he was transferred to Atlante, before returning to Toros Neza for 2001–2002, and then Club Zacatepec in 2002-2003. Arangio then relocated to the United Arab Emirates where he played for the Emirates Club from 2003 to 2005, before returning to Argentina to play 12 matches for Club Atlético Huracán in 2005 and 2006. He then transferred to Chile to play for Audax Italiano and then Club Deportivo Palestino.

On February 15, 2007 it was confirmed that he was signed to América de Cali in Colombia. He then returned to Argentina to play for Alumni de Villa María of the 3rd division interior.

In 2009, he returned to Mexico to play with Albinegros de Orizaba.

External links
 Argentine Primera statistics
Germán Arangio website
 video

References

1976 births
Living people
Footballers from Buenos Aires
Argentine footballers
Argentine expatriate footballers
Argentina youth international footballers
Argentina under-20 international footballers
Association football forwards
Argentine Primera División players
Chilean Primera División players
Liga MX players
Categoría Primera A players
Racing Club de Avellaneda footballers
Club Atlético Huracán footballers
Atlante F.C. footballers
América de Cali footballers
Resende Futebol Clube players
Club Deportivo Palestino footballers
Audax Italiano footballers
Expatriate footballers in Chile
Expatriate footballers in Brazil
Expatriate footballers in Mexico
Expatriate footballers in Colombia
Argentine expatriate sportspeople in Brazil
Emirates Club players
Toros Neza footballers
Argentine expatriate sportspeople in the United Arab Emirates
UAE Pro League players